

Men's 200 m Butterfly - Final

Men's 200 m Butterfly - Heats

Men's 200 m Butterfly - Heat 01

Men's 200 m Butterfly - Heat 02

Men's 200 m Butterfly - Heat 03

Swimming at the 2006 Commonwealth Games